"ABC-123" is a song performed by American contemporary R&B group LeVert. The song is the closing track on their sixth studio album For Real Tho' and was issued as the album's second single. Co-written and co-produced by lead singer Gerald Levert, it was the last song from the group to chart on the Billboard Hot 100, peaking at #46 in 1993.

Chart positions

References

External links
 
 

1993 songs
1993 singles
Atlantic Records singles
LeVert songs
Song recordings produced by Gerald Levert
Songs written by Gerald Levert